Dragoljub Savić (born 25 April 2001) is a Serbian footballer playing for Rapid Wien.

Club career

Vojvodina
On 12 May 2019, Savić made his first team debut, replacing Aranđel Stojković in 67th minute, in 2:1 home loss to Partizan.

Rapid Wien
In summer 2019, Savić left Vojvodina and signed for Rapid Wien, where he was assigned to the reserve team. He made his Austrian Football Bundesliga debut for the senior squad on 21 June 2020 in a game against TSV Hartberg.

Career statistics

Club

Notes

References

External links
 
 

2001 births
Living people
Footballers from Novi Sad
Association football forwards
Serbian footballers
FK Vojvodina players
SK Rapid Wien players
Serbian SuperLiga players
Austrian Football Bundesliga players
2. Liga (Austria) players
Serbian expatriate footballers
Expatriate footballers in Austria